Directorate of National Consumer Rights Protection is a quasi-judicial government department responsible for hearing and addressing consumer complaints over goods and services. It is headquartered in Dhaka with local offices in every divisional cities of Bangladesh.

History
The Directorate of National Consumer Rights Protection was founded in 2009 through the Consumer Rights Protection Act, 2009. The act also created the supplementary National Consumer Right Protection Council. The Directorate of National Consumer Rights Protection is led by a Director General. Consumers can file complaint against business with the Directorate of National Consumer Rights Protection. The directorate after an investigation can place fines on the company if they find against the company. The directorate will give 25 percent of the fine to the complaint. The aggrieved consumer cannot take legal action against the responsible company without the explicit permission of the Directorate, which has drawn criticism from consumer advocacy groups that the law is actually against the interests of the consumers.

References

Government departments of Bangladesh
Government agencies of Bangladesh
2009 establishments in Bangladesh
Organisations based in Dhaka
Consumer rights agencies